The 2012 Turkmenistan Cup is 20th since independence of the Turkmen national football cup.

Round 1
The Round 1 involves 16 teams. Games played on 13 and 16 November 2012.

|}

Quarterfinals
The quarterfinals involve 8 teams. Games played on 19 and 22 November 2012.

|}

Semifinals
The semifinals involve 4 teams. Games will be played on 26 and 29 November 2012.

|}

Final
Game will be played on 5 December 2012.

See also
 2012 Ýokary Liga

External links
 http://www.turkmenistan.gov.tm
 http://www.the-afc.com
 http://www.ertir.com/index.php?q=blog&view=43325
 http://ertir.com/index.php?q=blog&view=45028

Turkmenistan Cup
Turkmenistan Cup, 2012